Mirko Wolter (born 6 September 1976 in Güstrow, Germany) is a speedway rider who first rode in the United Kingdom, riding with the Sheffield Tigers in the Premier League. After a six-year absence he was signed by the Trelawny Tigers in 2003.

He appeared as a wildcard in 2001 German Speedway Grand Prix.

Speedway Grand Prix results

Career details

World Championships 

 Individual Speedway World Championship (Speedway Grand Prix)
 2001 - 35th place (2 pts in one event)
 Team World Championship (Speedway World Team Cup and Speedway World Cup)
 2002 - 3rd placed in the Semi Final Two
 2002 - started in the Qualifying round only
 2003 -  - 10th place (5 points in the Event 1)
 Individual U-21 World Championship
 1994 -  Elgane - 13th place (2 pts)
 1995 -  Tampere - 13th place (2 pts)

European Championships 

 European Pairs Championship
 2004 -  Debrecen - 5th place (7 pts)

See also 
 Germany national speedway team

References 

1976 births
Living people
German speedway riders
Sheffield Tigers riders
Trelawny Tigers riders
People from Güstrow
Sportspeople from Mecklenburg-Western Pomerania